Calderstones Park is a public park in Liverpool, Merseyside, United Kingdom. The  park is mainly a family park. Within it there are a variety of different attractions including a playground, a botanical garden and places of historical interest.
There is a lake in the park with geese and ducks, and the Calderstones Mansion House, which features a café and a children's play area.

Notable Features

The Calderstones 

The Calderstones are six neolithic sandstone boulders remaining from a dolmen.

Little was known about the Calderstones until the 18th century when they are thought to have been disturbed. In 1825 it was reported that, "in digging about them, urns made of the coarsest clay, containing human dust and bones were found".

During the mid and later 19th century certain academics had declared the Calderstones to have been part of a druidical circle. In the closing years of the century Professor Herdman returned to the earlier evidence and concluded that the stones were once part of a ruined dolmen which had been mistakenly taken for a circle due to the false impression held that all druidical remains should be so arranged.

The six surviving stones are of local sandstone and their sizes range from approximately eight by three feet to three and a half by two and a half feet. The markings which had been studied the previous century by Simpson were again analysed and latex moulds were made of the stones and carvings, which both enabled a precise record to be made and also highlight other worn carvings which were not previously visible. The carvings were placed into six categories; spirals, concentric circles, arcs, cup marks, cup and ring marks and footprints. There is also evidence of post-medieval and modern graffiti. Several of the carvings are similar to examples found in Anglesey and the late-neolithic burial site of Newgrange in the Boyne Valley.

The stones were relocated by Joseph Need Walker during his ownership, becoming a gateway feature to the eponymous estate. The stones are now housed in the Harthill Greenhouses in Calderstones Park, having been moved from their previous location in an enclosure just outside the park gates in 1954 to protect them from further weathering.

Calderstones House 

The mansion house was built in 1828 by Joseph Need Walker to replace the original farmhouse known as the Old House. The house is of Georgian style, though it has been subject to some alterations over the years and now houses council offices and a small café. The extensive stables and coachhouse remain at the rear of the house. The mansion house is currently being refurbished to accommodate the International Headquarters for Shared Reading. This refurbishment is being run by the Reader Organisation.

The Allerton Oak
One of the park's two most ancient features, estimated at 1,000 years old, is an oak tree. According to legend the ancient local Hundred Court sat beneath its branches. Its dilapidated state is said to be due to the explosion of the gunpowder ship Lottie Sleigh over three miles away on the River Mersey in 1864. It is dependent upon a number of props that hold it up.

Acorns and leaves from the oak were sent to soldiers by their families during World War II, such was the reputation of this tree. The tree was named England's 'tree of the year' in 2019 by Woodland Trust.

Botanical garden
After World War II Percy Conn, the new Superintendent of Liverpool Parks, had the vision to recreate the Liverpool Botanic Garden of William Roscoe & John Shepherd from the Mount Pleasant days, in the Harthill Estate grounds at Calderstones Park. This work was started in 1951 and completed in 1964 when the set of 16 connected glasshouses was formally opened.
Calderstones botanical garden contained almost 4,000 species of plants brought from all over the world by merchants and other travellers.

As funding was very tight post-war, low-grade spruce, rather than teak, was used to build the glasshouses, and by 1979 they had reached the end of their useful lives. The early 1980s was another occasion when the Liverpool City economy was dire, and no money could be found to re-build the glasshouses. The botanical importance of the park encouraged further horticultural improvements such as the creation of a Japanese Garden by park apprentices in 1969, and the introduction of a ‘bog garden’ linked to the artificial lake. In 1984 the glasshouses were closed and all the plants transported to the Liverpool City nursery at Garston, where they remained for the next 23 years. Some of the plants were occasionally seen at Southport Flower Shows over this period. In 2007/2008 a third of the plants were re-housed in 4 glasshouses within Croxteth Hall’s walled gardens when Garston Nursery was closed as a consequence of the outsourcing of Liverpool's Park & Garden maintenance work.

Activities in the park

Tennis Tournament

Set in the park, the Tradition-ICAP Liverpool International began in 2002 (with the women's event beginning in 2006) and has attracted many well known tennis stars such as Martina Navratilova, Ivan Ljubičić and David Ferrer. In 2008 the tournament attracted over 2500 spectators.

Solstice
On 21 December 2009 the Winter Solstice was celebrated in the park.

See also 
List of parks and open spaces in Merseyside

References

Further reading

External links 
 Council Page
 A Liverpool Heritage Forum
 The Calderstones
 Fungi in Calderstones park
 Miniature Railway (run by Merseyside Live Steam and Model Engineers)

Parks and commons in Liverpool
Japanese gardens in England